Conioselinum tataricum is a species of flowering plant belonging to the family Apiaceae.

Its native range is Afghanistan to Central Asia and Himalaya.

References

Apioideae